Frederick William Beardsley (13 July 1856 – 1939) was an English footballer, chiefly associated with the foundation of Arsenal Football Club. Beardsley was the first ever Vice-captain of what was to be Arsenal Football Club after beginning work as an iron turner at the Royal Gun factory, and helping to found the club in its early days.

Career

Nottingham Forest 
Beardsley is known to have played for Nottingham Forest from at least 1884, and even through moving to London, continued to make guest appearances for the club. Famously in 1886, he asked Nottingham forest for some kits and a ball to help start what was to be Arsenal F.C. giving them the red kit which they wear to this very day.

Dial Square/Royal Arsenal 
Fred Beardsley made his first ever appearance against Eastern Wanderers, in Arsenal's very first game, as the club's inaugural goalkeeper. He was the first-choice goalkeeper across the next 4 seasons, up until his retirement in 1891. With the Royal Arsenal, he won the Kent Senior Cup, the London Charity Cup and was a runner up in the London Senior cup. It is unclear as to how many appearances in total Beardsley made due to the paucity of the line-ups, however he made two FA Cup appearances, in Royal Arsenal's first ever FA cup matches.

Continued Involvement in Football 
Beardsley retired in 1891 from his playing career, but was elected to Vice-chairman and continued to sit on the board of directors for Royal Arsenal F.C. for another two decades as well as working as a scout for the club. He did not retire from the club entirely until 1910, at the age of 54.

References

External links 
Player profile - 11v11

1856 births
1939 deaths
Footballers from Nottingham
English footballers
Association football goalkeepers
Nottingham Forest F.C. players
Arsenal F.C. players
Arsenal F.C. directors and chairmen